In music, a factor or chord factor is a member or component of a chord. These are named root, third, fifth, sixth, seventh, ninth (compound 2nd), eleventh (compound 4th), thirteenth (compound 6th), and so on, for their generic interval above the root.
In harmony, the consonance and dissonance of a chord factor and a nonchord tone are distinguished, respectively.

Chord factors are taken into consideration in voicing and voice leading. A chord contains exactly as many factors as it contains unique pitch names (octaves don't matter), while a voicing can have any number of voices that draw from and represent some or all the factors of a chord in various octaves. Thus, a chord with three unique pitch names always has three factors, even if some of those pitches are doubled or omitted in a particular voicing. For example, the figure to the right shows a four-note voicing of a C Major triad, which has three chord factors. The "root" chord factor (pitch name "C"), is represented twice in the voicing by voices 1 and 4 in different octaves. The chord factor called the "fifth" (pitch name "G") is represented in voice 2 (shown in red).

The chord factor that is in the bass determines the inversion of the chord. For example, if the third is in the bass it is a first inversion chord while if the seventh is in the bass the chord is in third inversion. The illustration shows one possible four-note voicing of a G7 third-inversion chord (written G7/F in lead-sheet chord-symbol notation), with every chord factor being represented once by a voice in the voicing.

In Tertian harmony, chords are made more complex, or "extended", by introducing additional chord factors stacked in thirds. The illustration shows the theoretical construction of a C13 chord having seven chord factors, with the "extended" chord factors shown in red. In real applications, it is common practice to omit the eleventh from voicings of a dominant 13 chord, because though being necessary to theoretically derive the thirteenth by stacking on it, the unaltered perfect eleventh clashes with the major third.

See also
Degree (music)
Sixth chord
Triad (music)

References